Vorunah is the debut album by Norwegian black/thrash metal band Sarke. It was released on 6 April 2009 via Indie Recordings.

History 
In 2008, Thomas "Sarke" Bergli, drummer for Khold, decided to form a solo project. Sarke contacted Darkthrone vocalist/guitarist Ted "Nocturno Culto" Skjellum, and in November of the same year they entered the studio and recorded Vorunah. In February 2009, it was announced that Sarke signed with Norwegian record label Indie Recordings.

Track listing

Credits 
 Sarke – guitar, bass, drums
 Nocturno Culto – vocals
 Anders Hunstad – keyboards

Production
Lars-Erik Westby – producer

References 

Indie Recordings albums
2009 albums
Sarke albums